Arda Peak is located in the east of Livingston Island, Antarctica.  The peak rises to approximately 470 m and is located in the Friesland Ridge, Tangra Mountains, overlooking the lower course of Charity Glacier to the northwest and Tarnovo Ice Piedmont to the southeast.  The peak is named "after the river Arda in Bulgaria."

Location

Maps
 L.L. Ivanov et al. Antarctica: Livingston Island and Greenwich Island, South Shetland Islands. Scale 1:100000 topographic map. Sofia: Antarctic Place-names Commission of Bulgaria, 2005.
 L.L. Ivanov. Antarctica: Livingston Island and Greenwich, Robert, Snow and Smith Islands. Scale 1:120000 topographic map.  Troyan: Manfred Wörner Foundation, 2009.

Notes

References
 Bulgarian Antarctic Gazetteer. Antarctic Place-names Commission. (details in Bulgarian, basic data in English)
 Arda Peak. SCAR Composite Gazetteer of Antarctica.

External links
 Arda Peak. Adjusted Copernix satellite image

Tangra Mountains